The Bachelor's Walk massacre occurred in Dublin, on 26 July 1914, when a column of troops of the King's Own Scottish Borderers were accosted by a crowd on Bachelor's Walk following the Howth gun-running operation. After some verbal baiting, the troops attacked “hostile but unarmed” protesters with rifle fire and bayonets - resulting in the deaths of four civilians and injuries to in excess of 30 more. One of those shot was Luke Kelly, the father of folk singer Luke Kelly.

The events followed the landing of 1,500 rifles and ammunition, purchased for the Irish Volunteers in Hamburg in May 1914. In a counter operation to the Unionists running guns into Northern Ireland, Erskine Childers landed the cargo in Howth and a thousand rifle-carrying Irish Volunteers marched into Dublin. The quantity was negligible when compared to the far greater numbers of weapons landed and distributed  by the Ulster Volunteers, completely without hindrance, but the reaction this time was severe from the British ruling authorities.

The incident proved a moment of political opportunity for Irish nationalists as it sharply brought out the different treatment for the Unionists and for unarmed Dublin civilians. Patrick Pearse declared 'The army is an object of odium, and the Volunteers are the heroes of the hour. The whole movement, the whole country, has been re-baptised by bloodshed for Ireland.'

References

1910s in Dublin (city)
1914 in Ireland
July 1914 events
20th-century history of the British Army
1914 crimes in Ireland